Royal Air Force Lossiemouth or more commonly RAF Lossiemouth  is a military airfield located on the western edge of the town of Lossiemouth in Moray, north-east Scotland.

Lossiemouth is one of the largest and busiest fast-jet stations in the Royal Air Force (RAF) and known for its close proximity to flight training areas in Scotland and its favourable local flying conditions. Since the closure of RAF Leuchars in 2015, Lossiemouth is the only operational RAF station in Scotland and is one of two main operating bases for the Eurofighter Typhoon FGR4 in the United Kingdom. It is home to four front-line fast jet units which operate the Typhoon: No. 1 Squadron, No. 2 Squadron, No. 6 Squadron and No. 9 Squadron. All four Squadrons contribute to the Quick Reaction Alert (Interceptor) North capability which provides continuous protection of UK airspace. It is also home to No. 120 Squadron and  No. 201 Squadron, both flying the Poseidon MRA1 in the maritime patrol role. It has also been designated as the future home of the RAF's new fleet of three Boeing Wedgetail AEW1 airborne early warning and control aircraft, with deliveries commencing in 2023. There are a number of non-flying units at RAF Lossiemouth including No. 5 Force Protection Wing and an RAF Mountain Rescue Service team.

The airfield opened in 1939 and was operated by the RAF, predominantly as part of Bomber Command, until 1946 when it transferred to the Fleet Air Arm (FAA) and became known as RNAS Lossiemouth or HMS Fulmar. Lossiemouth was used as a training station by the FAA until it was handed back to the RAF in September 1972, after which it has largely operated as a fast-jet base.

History

Construction (1938–1939) 
Construction started during the summer of 1938, when  of agricultural land was acquired in order to accommodate the airfield. The land was cleared of vegetation and buildings and by the spring of 1939 several wooden huts were present. Group Captain P.E Maitland was the first station commander and took up post in March 1939, with the station formally opening on 1 May 1939.  The first unit to take up residence at Lossiemouth was No. 15 Flying Training School RAF (15 FTS), initially equipped with thirteen Airspeed Oxfords and five Hawker Harts. Aircraft were stored in the open until the first hangars were completed in August 1939. That same month tragedy struck when three crew members were killed during a mid-air collision between two Oxfords.

Second World War (1939–1945)
At the outbreak of the Second World War, a detachment of Seaforth Highlanders was sent to Lossiemouth to guard the station, and anti-aircraft defences were installed. Flying activity increased, with 15 FTS receiving more Oxfords and Harts and the introduction of the North American Harvard; eleven Fairey Battles were also delivered for storage. The first front-line aircraft to operate from Lossiemouth were a detachment of twelve Vickers Wellington bombers belonging to No. 99 Squadron, arriving in November 1939 to take part in attack missions targeting the German cruiser , which was operating between Iceland and the Shetland Isles. January 1940 saw detachments of Handley Page Hampdens from No. 44 Squadron and No. 50 Squadron arrive to take part in offensive patrols over the North Sea. However, the operation was short-lived as a result of bad weather, with the aircraft returning to their home base in mid-February.

A detachment of No. 9 Squadron spent a short period of time operating Wellingtons during April 1940, before being replaced by No. 107 Squadron and No. 110 Squadron, which were equipped with Bristol Blenheims. During this period the first loss to enemy action of an aircraft operating from Lossiemouth occurred when three Blenheims were shot down over Norway.

It soon became apparent that the frequent detachments of bomber aircraft were disrupting the training programme at Lossiemouth, and therefore, due to the strategic importance of the station as a base for bomber aircraft, it was decided to relocate 15 FTS to RAF Middle Wallop in Hampshire. On 27 April 1940, after the unit's departure, Lossiemouth transferred to No. 6 Group of RAF Bomber Command and No. 20 Operational Training Unit (20 OTU) was established, initially operating Wellingtons and Avro Ansons.

No. 46 Maintenace Unit (46 MU) was also formed in April 1940. 46 MU's role was to modify and fit out new aircraft before they were forwarded to front-line squadrons. A variety of aircraft were serviced, including Hawker Hurricanes, de Havilland Tiger Moths, Hawker Audaxes, and a de Havilland Hornet Moth. The unit primarily used six Robin and eight Super Robin hangars; however, due to a shortage of space, many aircraft were stored in fields outside the station. Lossiemouth's first satellite airfield, located at Bogs of Mayne  to the south and known as RAF Elgin, opened in June 1940.

One officer and two aircrew were killed on 26 October 1940 when RAF Lossiemouth was attacked by the Luftwaffe for the first time. The attack by three Heinkel He 111 bombers resulted in the destruction of two Blenheims and damage to two Miles Magisters, two Tiger Moths and a Hurricane. Three hangars were also damaged, the resultant holes from cannon fire still visible today. One of the Heinkels crashed on the airfield, having either been hit by ground fire or destroyed by its own bombs. All four of the crew are buried in a Lossiemouth churchyard. As a result of the raid, Hurricanes of No. 232 Squadron were moved to RAF Elgin to protect the area from attacks.

Flying activity in early 1941 was limited due to the poor condition of the airfield; improved weather in the Spring increased activity from 20 OTU and 46 MU, as well as from continued bomber detachments. Operational sorties were predominately undertaken by Blenheims of No. 21 Squadron, No. 82 Squadron, No. 110 Squadron and No. 114 Squadron. By the winter of 1941, the airfield had become so muddy that the Wellingtons of 20 OTU were temporarily relocated to RAF Lakenheath in Suffolk. The increased activity by 46 MU resulted in two satellite landing grounds (SLG) being established to store aircraft off-site. These were at RAF Black Isle (42 SLG) where Bristol Beaufighters were kept and RAF Leanach (43 SLG) near Culloden, where Hurricanes and Supermarine Spitfires were stored.

Lossiemouth was used during 1942 as a base to launch several unsuccessful missions to sink the German battleship , which at the time was operating in Norwegian fjords. The first missions were undertaken in January 1942 by a detachment of thirteen Short Stirlings of No. 15 Squadron and No. 149 Squadron and thirteen Handley Page Halifaxes of No. 10 Squadron and No. 76 Squadron. Further attempts were made during April by Avro Lancasters of No. 44 Squadron and No. 97 Squadron and Halifaxes of No. 10 Squadron. Lancasters of No. 9 Squadron later joined the operation. 1942 also saw numerous accidents involving 20 OTU aircraft, many of which resulted in death and serious injuries. These accidents were attributed to a combination of fatigued aircraft, inexperienced crews and poor weather. Wellingtons of 20 OTU were also involved in strategic bombing raids on German cities throughout 1942, the training aircraft being required to help reach the target number of 1000 bombers per raid. The airfield's first surfaced runways, (06/24 ; 09/27 ; 01/19 ), were constructed by an engineering battalion of the US Army Air Force in late 1942 and helped to reduce interruptions to flying as a result of the grass strips being affected by poor weather. A new control tower was also constructed.

By now 46 MU were concentrating their work on Bristol Beaufighters and Lancasters and the SLG at RAF Leanach had been replaced with a new site at Dornoch golf course, which became known as RAF Dornoch (40 SLG). 20 OTU received its official crest in 1943, with two examples cast in concrete being constructed at Lossiemouth and RAF Elgin. The crest at Lossiemouth no longer exists and although little now remains of the airfield at Elgin, the concrete crest is a war memorial for those who served there.

Further operations against Tirpitz took place between September and November 1944. Operation Catechism finally resulted in the German battleship being sunk near Tromsø on 12 November 1944. Thirty-eight Lancasters of No. 9 Squadron and No. 617 Squadron launched from Lossiemouth, Kinloss and Milltown and destroyed the vessel with Tallboy bombs. Nearly 50 years later, No. 617 Squadron transferred to Lossiemouth and was based there between 1993 and 2014. Examples of the Tallboy, Grand Slam and Up Keep (bouncing bomb) were on display within the squadron site.

In July 1945, after the end of hostilities in Europe, 20 OTU was disbanded and 46 MU continued to prepare aircraft for operations in the Far East. After the war ended, 46 MU began the enormous task of breaking-up surplus aircraft for scrap. At one point there were around 900 aircraft on the airfield awaiting disposal. On 28 July 1945 Lossiemouth was transferred to No. 17 Group of RAF Coastal Command, with the arrival of No. 111 (Coastal) Operational Training Unit from the Bahamas shortly thereafter. By August 1945, the unit was operating forty-one Consolidated Liberators, ten Halifaxes and a North American Mitchell; the unit was disbanded in July 1946.

HMS Fulmar (1946–1972) 
Lossiemouth transferred from the Royal Air Force to the Fleet Air Arm (FAA) on 2 July 1946 and became known as Royal Navy Air Station (RNAS) Lossiemouth or HMS Fulmar. On the FAA taking control, No. 46 MU moved to RAF Elgin. Lossiemouth was used as a basic training station for FAA pilots who moved on to RNAS Culdrose (HMS Seahawk) in Cornwall for instrument training. RAF Milltown also transferred to the FAA, became known as HMS Fulmar II and operated as a Deck Landing Training School. The first FAA squadron, No. 766 Naval Air Squadron, arrived in August 1946 and operated Supermarine Seafires and Fairey Fireflies until its departure to RNAS Culdrose in 1953. In the late 1940s, to replace poor quality war-era facilities, seven hundred new married living-quarters were constructed in the nearby towns of Lossiemouth and Elgin, with the first opening in September 1949. The practice of constructing living-quarters off-station differed from that of the RAF, which typically constructed such accommodation within the boundaries of their airfields. In 1952 and early 1953, Lossiemouth's runways were upgraded and extended to their present lengths; during that time aircraft temporarily operated from Milltown.

The Naval Air Fighter and Strike Training School transferred to the station in 1953 and over the next decade many aircraft types operated from Lossiemouth in the training role, including Supermarine Seafires, Fairey Fireflys, Hawker Sea Hawks, Hawker Sea Furys, Supermarine Scimitars, De Havilland Sea Venoms and Hawker Hunters. Four Gloster Meteors were used as target-towers. One of the first squadrons of the recently established Federal Germany Navy was formed at Lossiemouth in May 1958 under the NATO cooperative policy. No. 764 Naval Air Squadron had responsibility for training German crews on twelve Sea Hawks, which operated in German Navy markings. A commissioning ceremony was attended by British and German naval and political figures. In 1958 it was announced that station facilities were to be upgraded at a cost of £3 million, including the refurbishment of living accommodation and the creation of the Fulmar Club social club. Princess Alexandra opened a new officers mess in July 1965.

The Blackburn Buccaneer arrived in March 1961 when No. 700Z Naval Air Squadron was created as an Intensive Flying Trials unit to evaluate the aircraft's weapons, systems and performance. Initially, the squadron operated two aircraft and then five by the end of 1961. The first operational Buccaneer squadron (No. 801 Naval Air Squadron) was established on 17 July 1962, followed by No. 809 Naval Air Squadron in January 1963 and No. 800 Naval Air Squadron in March 1964. The Buccaneer was capable of delivering nuclear weapons as well as conventional weapons for anti-shipping warfare and was typically active over the North Sea during its service. The mid-1960s saw further investment in facilities at Lossiemouth including new living quarters and messes.

The 1966 Defence White Paper saw the withdrawal of most British military forces stationed East of Suez during the 1970s, reducing the need for aircraft carriers and fixed-wing naval aviation such as the Buccaneer. The aircraft had been considered by the RAF for a medium-range interdictor and tactical strike aircraft. As a result, No. 736 Naval Air Squadron began training RAF air and ground crews on the Buccaneer in 1969. Between September 1967 and March 1970, the Fleet Air Arm's most decorated pilot, Captain Eric 'Winkle' Brown was station commander; it was his last command. The late 1960s saw the FAA reduce its activities at Lossiemouth, although Fairey Gannets of No. 849 Naval Air Squadron were transferred from RNAS Brawdy to Lossiemouth on 13 November 1971. The Buccaneer force was reduced in size with several squadrons departing or disbanding in the late 1960s and early 1970s. The last Buccaneers, of No. 809 Naval Air Squadron, left on 25 September 1972, leaving the only Fleet Air Arm aircraft left being the Gannets and search and rescue helicopters.

Return of the Royal Air Force (1972–1991) 

The station was returned to Royal Air Force control on 28 September 1972, with the first RAF squadron operating from the new RAF Lossiemouth being 'D' Flight, No. 202 Squadron in the helicopter search and rescue role. The Jaguar Conversion Team (designated No. 226 Operational Conversion Unit on 1 October 1974) arrived in May 1973 to train the RAF's first SEPECAT Jaguar crews. By late 1974, No. 6 Squadron and No. 54 Squadron were operational.

In August 1973, No. 8 Squadron and their twelve Avro Shackleton AEW.2s, operating as airborne early warning (AEW) aircraft, moved to Lossiemouth from nearby RAF Kinloss. The Shackleton was an interim aircraft for the RAF AEW requirement, which saw the gradual replacement of Fleet Air Arm Fairey Gannets, culminating in the disbandment of No. 849 Naval Air Squadron in November 1978. Towards the end of the 1970s, two non-flying defence units took up residence at the station, starting with the arrival in December 1978 of No. 48 Squadron RAF Regiment equipped with Rapier surface-to-air missiles. July 1979 saw the formation of No. 2622 (Highland) Royal Air Force Auxiliary Regiment for ground defence. From 1978 to 1980, No. 2 Tactical Weapons Unit operated the Hawker Hunter from Lossiemouth.

The Buccaneer made a return to Lossiemouth in the 1980s as RAF maritime strike aircraft, the first arriving in November 1980 when No. 12 Squadron transferred from RAF Honington in Suffolk, followed by No. 208 Squadron in July 1983. The remainder of the RAF Buccaneer fleet arrived in October 1984 when No. 237 Operational Conversion Unit (OCU), took up residence. Although the Buccaneer training unit, No. 237 OCU also had a reserve role of overland laser designation in support of RAF Jaguars.

Operation Granby 

During the 1991 Gulf War, personnel from all three Buccaneer squadrons took part in Operation Granby, the aircraft's first combat operation. Following a short-notice decision to deploy to the Middle East, the first batch of six aircraft were brought to readiness in under 72 hours, including the adoption of desert-pink camouflage and additional war-time equipment. The first six aircraft departed from Lossiemouth for Muharraq in Bahrain at 04:00 on 26 January 1991. Twelve Buccaneers operated as laser designators and it became common for each attack formation to comprise four Tornados and two Buccaneers; each Buccaneer carrying a Pave Spike laser designator pod, one as a spare in case of equipment failure. The Buccaneer force became known as the Sky Pirates in reference to the maritime history of the Buccaneer. Each aircraft had a Jolly Roger flag painted on its port side, alongside nose art featuring female characters. In recognition of their Scottish roots, the Buccaneers were also named after Speyside whisky such as Glenfiddich, Glen Elgin and The Macallan. Hostilities ended in late February 1991, the Buccaneers having flown 218 sorties without loss, designating targets for other aircraft and later dropping 48 Paveway II laser-guided bombs.

Transition to Tornado (1991–1999) 
The replacement for the ageing Shackleton AEW.2, the British Aerospace Nimrod AEW.3, suffered considerable development difficulties which culminated in the aircraft being cancelled during 1986, for an off-the-shelf purchase of the Boeing Sentry AEW1. The last Shackletons were retired in July 1991 and No. 8 Squadron transferred to RAF Waddington in Lincolnshire, to equip with their new aircraft.

It had been planned for the Buccaneer to remain in service until the end of the 1990s, having been extensively modernised in a process lasting up to 1989; the end of the Cold War stimulated major changes in British defence policy, many aircraft being deemed surplus to requirements. To allow for the early retirement of the Buccaneer, twenty-six Panavia Tornado GR1s were modified to GR1B standard to allow use of the BAe Sea Eagle missile for maritime strike operations. The reduction of the Buccaneer fleet began on 1 October 1991 when No. 237 OCU was disbanded, followed by No. 12 Squadron in September 1993. No. 27 Squadron, then at RAF Marham, disbanded and re-formed at Lossiemouth as No.12 Squadron, operating the Tornado GR1B.

In 1992, No. 237 Field Squadron of the Territorial Army was formed with responsibility for Airfield Damage Repair (ADR). This squadron became part of No. 76 Engineer Regiment (Volunteers) of the Royal Engineers, responsible for ADR in the north of England and across Scotland. The Tornado Weapons Conversion Unit, renamed No. 15 (Reserve) Squadron, arrived from RAF Honington in Suffolk on 1 November 1993. The last Buccaneers were withdrawn in April 1994 when No. 208 Squadron disbanded. No. 617 Squadron then transferred to Lossiemouth from RAF Marham in Norfolk, with its Tornado GR1Bs. No. 48 Squadron RAF Regiment and their Rapiers left Lossiemouth for RAF Honington on 1 July 1996. Group Captain Graham Miller was station commander between 1995 and 1998 and later achieved the rank of Air Marshal, holding the post of Deputy Commander at Allied Joint Force Command in Naples from 2004 until his retirement in 2008.

No. 15 (R) Squadron increased in size in 1999 after the closure of the Tri-national Tornado Training Establishment (TTTE) at RAF Cottesmore. The squadron became the RAF Tornado GR4 Operational Conversion Unit, training pilots and weapon systems operators for posting to front-line Tornado squadrons at Lossiemouth and RAF Marham. The squadron accepted aircrew straight from advanced flying training at RAF Leeming and RAF Valley and provided refresher courses for experienced aircrew returning to the Tornado GR4, following other tours of duty. The squadron also trained aircrew officers from foreign nations posted to the UK on two to three-year exchange tours.

21st century 

To concentrate the Jaguar fleet in one place, No. 16(R) Squadron with eleven aircraft and around 100 personnel departed Lossiemouth for RAF Coltishall in Norfolk in July 2000, bringing to an end Lossiemouth's 27-year association with the Jaguar. After the arrival of No. 14 Squadron and its Tornado GR1s from RAF Brüggen in Germany during January 2001, Lossiemouth became the busiest fast-jet station in the RAF. In May 2001, No. 51 Squadron RAF Regiment was re-established, to join No. 2622 RAuxAF Squadron, under the new No. 5 Force Protection Wing Headquarters.

F-35 Lightning II and threat of closure 
The Ministry of Defence announced in November 2005 that Lossiemouth would be the main operating base for the RAF's new F-35 Lightning II fleet, which was expected to enter service in 2013. In 2010 The Strategic Defence and Security Review (SDSR) cast doubt on whether the F-35 would be based at Lossiemouth and raised fears in the local community that the station could close. On 7 November 2010 up to 7,000 people took part in a march and rally in Lossiemouth in support of retaining the RAF station, including Scotland's First Minister Alex Salmond and other politicians. With Moray being the area in Scotland most dependent on military spending, it was feared the closure of RAF Lossiemouth and the confirmed closure of nearby RAF Kinloss, would lead to economic uncertainty and much more unemployment. A petition with more than 30,000 signatures was delivered to 10 Downing Street by campaign members on 11 January 2011.

In July 2011 the Ministry of Defence announced that Lossiemouth would remain open with Lossiemouth's Tornados moving to RAF Marham. RAF Leuchars in Fife would close and transfer to the British Army, with the Eurofighter Typhoon FGR4s and responsibility for Quick Reaction Alert (Interceptor) North (QRA) moving to Lossiemouth. In March 2013 the Ministry of Defence confirmed that the F-35 Lighting II would be based at Marham.

From Tornado to Typhoon

After the SDSR, No. 14 Squadron disbanded on 1 June 2011, reducing the number of Tornados based at Lossiemouth. In 2012, a new combined mess for junior ranks and senior non-commission officers was completed, replacing separate buildings constructed in the 1960s, which were demolished. The new facility was opened by the then station commander Group Captain Ian Gale and the Lord Lieutenant of Moray, Grenville Johnston.

Following the announcement in 2011 that Lossiemouth would remain open, £17 million was spent in 2013 refurbishing the airfield for the arrival of the Typhoon, with a further £70 million set aside for later. Quick Reaction Alert (QRA) facilities were built in the northern hardened aircraft shelter (HAS) complex and alterations were made to hangars 1 and 3 and new ground-support IT and communication systems. In March 2014, three Typhoons from RAF Leuchars arrived at Lossiemouth to take part in Exercise Moray Venture, a week-long operation to test new facilities ahead of the aircraft's arrival later that year.

In preparation for the transition to the Typhoon, No.12 Squadron and No.617 Squadron disbanded on 1 April 2014, leaving No.15 (R) Squadron as the only remaining Tornado unit at Lossiemouth.  The first Typhoon unit, No. 6 Squadron, transferred from RAF Leuchars to Lossiemouth on 20 June 2014. Nine aircraft arrived in formation in the shape of a number 6. No. 1 Squadron followed on 8 September 2014, when responsibility for Quick Reaction Alert (North) was transferred from RAF Leuchars to Lossiemouth.

The third Typhoon squadron based at Lossiemouth, No. 2 Squadron, arrived in January 2015. In preparation of the squadron's arrival, work commenced in October 2014 to refurbish the southern HAS complex, which was formerly occupied by No.617 Squadron. The nine aircraft shelters were refurbished, a hard-standing for a flight-line capable of accommodating eight aircraft was built, new flood-lighting was installed and the dining facilities were improved. A new headquarters building was constructed on the site of a World War II era K-type hangar (K20). The building has space for engineering and logistics facilities, a survival equipment section, classrooms and office space. This allowed No. 2 Squadron to operate independently from other squadrons at Lossiemouth.

In May 2015, construction began on a new  section of taxiway to provide improved access between the QRA facilities in the northern HAS site and runway 23/05. The new taxiway was constructed by 53 Field Squadron, part of 39 (Air Support) Engineer Regiment, Royal Engineers, based at nearby Kinloss Barracks. The project was completed in September 2015.

No. 15 (R) Squadron disbanded as a Tornado unit on 31 March 2017. Aircraft and crews were absorbed into front-line squadrons at RAF Marham where refresher training on the Tornado was carried out. To mark the occasion, on 17 March 2017, five Tornados from the squadron carried out a flypast of the former RAF base at Leuchars, the weapons range at RAF Tain and Aberdeen International Airport, before performing a simulated airfield strike on RAF Lossiemouth in front of base personnel, families and friends. A disbandment parade was held on 31 March 2017, signifying the end of twenty-four years of Tornado operations at Lossiemouth. Over 750 current and former squadron personnel attended the ceremony where the "Sands of Kuwait", a tune written to commemorate the 1991 Gulf War (the squadron's last battle honour), was played on the bagpipes and a Tornado fly-past took place.

The final infrastructure required to support the Typhoons was completed in June 2017, when Rolls-Royce opened its Typhoon Propulsion Support Facility; this is operated by a combination of civilian and RAF personnel and provides engineering support for Typhoon Eurojet EJ200 engines.

On 4 March 2016 Lossiemouth was announced as the preferred option to accommodate an additional Typhoon squadron and 400 personnel. Four Typhoon FGR4s were assigned to No. 9 Squadron (Designate) at Lossiemouth in February 2019. The unit re-equipped as an aggressor and air defence squadron operating Typhoon Tranche 1 on 1 April 2019, thereby continuing in unbroken service upon the Tornado's retirement at RAF Marham.

End of search and rescue (SAR) operations 

In 2006, government announced its intentions to privatise the RAF Search and Rescue Force (the search and rescue (SAR) helicopter service). A ten-year contract worth £1.6 billion was signed in March 2013 with Bristow Helicopters to run the service from 2015 with new AgustaWestland AW189 and Sikorsky S-92 helicopters. 'D' flight of No. 202 Squadron disbanded on 1 April 2015 and its Sea King HAR3s were stored at RAF Valley, Anglesey, bringing nearly 43 years of search and rescue operations at Lossiemouth to an end. The Sea Kings had been a familiar sight in the skies above Scotland, having been involved in the Piper Alpha disaster, Lockerbie bombing and appearing in local and national media.

A farewell party to be held by 'D' Flight personnel to thank the local community for their support, was cancelled by RAF officials. There was widespread criticism of the decision but the RAF considered that the event could contravene campaigning rules for the UK general election, as it could be perceived as being political.

Morayvia, a local charity bought the former Lossiemouth Sea King 'XZ592' from the Ministry of Defence in March 2015. The aircraft is now on display as part of Morayvia's Science and Technology Experience Project at Kinloss.

Arrival of Poseidon 
On 23 November 2015, the UK announced its intention to order nine new Boeing MRA1 Poseidon maritime patrol aircraft in the SDSR. In June 2017, it was announced that No. 120 Squadron would be the first Poseidon squadron. The unit reformed in early 2018 and by February 2019 air and ground crews from the unit and the Poseidon Line Squadron had commenced training with the US Navy at Naval Air Station Jacksonville, Florida.

Construction of a new hangar and support facility for the Poseidon fleet, known as the Poseidon Strategic Facility, begun in April 2018 and was completed in July 2020. The  facility was built on the northern side of the airfield and includes maintenance facilities capable of accommodating three aircraft simultaneously, a tactical operations centre, training & simulation facilities and accommodation for two squadrons. The building was constructed by Robertson Northern with a contract value of £132m. In August 2021, it was named the 'Atlantic Building', reflecting its maritime warfare role.

As Lossiemouth's airfield was largely set-up for fast-jet operations, the runways and associated operating surfaces required resurfacing and alterations to safely accommodate regular Poseidon operations. Work on the £75 million contract commenced in May 2020, with the airfield being closed between 10 August and 16 October 2020 whilst the intersection of the two runways was resurfaced. During the closure, routine Typhoon training operations were relocated to the airfield at Kinloss Barracks and the Quick Reaction Alert (QRA) Force for the north of the UK temporarily relocated to Leuchars Station. The RAF's first Poseidon arrived in the UK from the US in February 2020, initially operating from Kinloss. It was later joined by a second aircraft before both moved to their new home at Lossiemouth in October 2020. The fleet was completed in January 2022 when the ninth aircraft was delivered to Lossiemouth. No. 201 Squadron reformed at Lossiemouth during 2021 as the second unit operating the Poseidon, sharing the fleet with No. 120 Squadron.

Facilities 

Hangars at Lossiemouth date from the Second World War and comprise three C-type, one J-type, six L-type, four K-type and a Bellman type. The northern HAS complex has nine shelters and QRA facilities and the southern complex has a further nine shelters. Both HAS complexes were constructed in the 1970s.

The airfield boundary has changed over the years and several former Super Robin hangars, dating from the Second World War are outside the current airfield boundary, although they are no longer in military use. An example is within the grounds of Gordounston School. Former airfield dispersals are also evident in the same vicinity. During the Second World War the airfield was defended with eight pillboxes, at least six of them Type 27 pillboxes, one rectangular and the other Type 22 or Type 24.

BAE Systems operates the Typhoon Training Facility (North), which is home to four Emulated Deployable Cockpit Trainer (EDCT) flight simulators. The expansion of the facility from two to four EDCTs was completed in April 2018. During the Tornado's tenure at Lossiemouth, the station was home to two Tornado GR4 flight simulators, operated by Thales UK.

Aviation fuel is supplied to Lossiemouth through a -stretch of the CLH Pipeline System which connects the airfield to a fuel depot in Inverness.

In common with other military establishments in Scotland and Northern Ireland, CarillionAmey, a joint venture between Carillion and Amey, provide hard facilities management and maintenance at Lossiemouth.

In March 2015, the UK government ruled out Lossiemouth as well as nearby RAF Kinloss as candidates for a new spaceport due to opposition from the Ministry of Defence, which cited over-riding operational factors. The decision was criticised by local politicians.

In 2021, construction started on a new fire station and new Oshkosh Striker vehicles were introduced.

Role and operations 
RAF Lossiemouth's mission statement is "Sustain Quick Reaction Alert (Interceptor) North and deliver global operations".

The Engineering & Logistics Wing is responsible for maintaining engineering support and supply including weapons and survival equipment on aircraft. It is also responsible for the maintenance and repair of aircraft not currently flying on squadrons and the station support equipment and vehicles. The Operations Wing plans and controls all flying and major exercises on station and manages all activities that have a direct impact on flying operations. This includes intelligence gathering, weather forecasting and communications systems. The Base Support Wing manages all support functions for the station's infrastructure and personnel, such as health and safety, medical centre, non-flying training, accommodation, family support and the deployment of Station personnel.

Moray Flight of No. 602 (City of Glasgow) Squadron (Royal Auxiliary Air Force) was established in 2013 to support NATO maritime patrol aircraft and the UK Maritime Air Operations Centre when deployed to Lossiemouth. The unit is also supporting the introduction of the P-8A Poseidon at Lossiemouth.

With the closure of nearby RAF Kinloss and the transfer of the station to the British Army in July 2012, the RAF Kinloss Mountain Rescue Team (MRT) became the RAF Lossiemouth MRT. The team continued to operate from their purpose-built base at Kinloss Barracks for over two years, until they moved into a 'D' Flight No. 202 Squadron hangar in February 2015.

Command 
Group Captain Jim Lee was appointed as the Station Commander of RAF Lossiemouth on 8 July 2022.

In July 2017 a spaniel named Dee was made the official station mascot and given the rank of Sergeant. Dee is a former RAF Police working dog and specialised in explosives detection. He retired from operational duties when his leg was amputated as a result of an injury.

Typhoon operations 

The Typhoon FGR4 provides the RAF with a multi-role combat capability for air policing, peace support and high intensity conflict. Lossiemouth Typhoon squadrons have operated against ISIS in Iraq and Syria as part of Operation Shader and have participated in the NATO Baltic Air Policing mission where they operated from Ämari air base in Estonia.

Lossiemouth's four Typhoon squadrons are responsible for maintaining the Quick Reaction Alert (Interceptor) North mission (QRA(I)N). Aircraft and crews are held at a high state of readiness, 24 hours a day, 365 days a year, to respond to unidentified aircraft approaching UK airspace. QRA missions range from civilian airliners which have stopped responding to air traffic control, to intercepting Russian aircraft such as the Tupolev Tu-95 Bear and Tu-160 Blackjack.

No. 5 Force Protection Wing 

No. 5 Force Protection Wing HQ provides operational planning, command and control to two RAF Regiment field squadrons attached to the wing, No. 51 Squadron RAF Regiment and No. 2622 (Highland) Squadron's (RAuxAF), whose purpose is to protect RAF bases at home and abroad from ground attack. No. 2622 Squadron consists primarily of RAF Regiment gunners also trained as infantry and has a limited number of personnel in support duties. The unit provides officers and gunners to supplement the regular RAF Regiment on overseas operations and exercises. It is the only squadron in the RAF or RAuxAF to have its own Pipes and Drums band, which formed in 1999 and is open to both Service and civilian members. It is also the only operational squadron to have spent its existence based at Lossiemouth. Both squadrons have seen action on Operation Telic in Iraq and Operation Herrick in Afghanistan, with No. 51 Squadron also involved in Operation Shader against ISIS.

No. 4 RAF Police Squadron also falls under the command of the wing and has responsibility for policing and security in Scotland and northern England.

Air Training Corps – Highland Wing 
Lossiemouth is home to the Highland Wing of the Air Training Corps. A new Air Cadet Regional Centre was opened in October 2014, which contains the Highland Wing headquarters, activity centre with a flight simulator, radio communications training room, IT Suite and several briefing rooms. Overnight residential accommodation for 48 cadets and 8 adult staff is also provided. The centre was named after and opened by retired Group Captain Phil Dacre.

Based units
Flying and notable non-flying units based at RAF Lossiemouth.

Royal Air Force 

No. 1 Group

 Combat Air Force
 No. 1 Squadron – Typhoon FGR4
 No. 2 Squadron – Typhoon FGR4
 No. 6 Squadron – Typhoon FGR4
 No. 9 Squadron – Typhoon FGR4
 ISTAR Force
No. 120 Squadron – Poseidon MRA1
No. 201 Squadron – Poseidon MRA1
 Poseidon Line Squadron (PLS)
 Poseidon Tactical Operations Centre (TOC)

No. 2 Group
 No. 5 RAF Force Protection Wing
 No. 5 Force Protection Wing Headquarters
 No. 4 RAF Police (Typhoon) Squadron
No. 51 Squadron RAF Regiment
No. 2622 (Highland) Squadron Royal Auxiliary Air Force Regiment
Support Force
RAF Lossiemouth Mountain Rescue Team
No. 22 (Training) Group RAF 
 Air Training Corps – Highland Wing Headquarters

Future

Lossiemouth Development Programme 
The Defence Infrastructure Organisation formally announced the Lossiemouth Development Programme (LDP) in October 2016. The LDP involves £400 million being invested in RAF Lossiemouth for buildings and airfield infrastructure to allow the additional Typhoon squadron (IX(B) Squadron) and new Poseidon aircraft to operate from Lossiemouth, such as a new control tower, Defence Fire and Rescue Service facilities, single and family living accommodation. Professional consultancy firm WYG Plc was appointed as programme manager of the LDP.

In February 2017 an environmental impact assessment (EIA) screening opinion for redevelopment work was submitted to Moray Council, the local planning authority. The submission to Moray Council outlined the following proposed works at the station:

 Redevelopment of existing buildings and construction of new buildings to accommodate the Poseidon aircraft and additional Typhoon squadron.
 Construction of a new hangar and support facility for the Poseidon fleet. The facility will be located on the northern side of the airfield and be capable of accommodating three aircraft. It will include a tactical operations centre, an operational conversion unit, squadron accommodation, training and simulation facilities. It is to be constructed by Robertson Northern with a contract value of £132m. The first turf was cut for the Poseidon facilities by Defence Secretary Gavin Williamson on 19 April 2018.
 Refurbishment and/or extension of hangar no.2 and support facilities for the additional Typhoon squadron.
 Construction of a replacement airfield fire station
 Construction of new living accommodation (for officers, senior non-commissioned officers, junior ranks and transit accommodation) providing approximately 450 bedrooms across three and four-storey high buildings.
 Construction of support buildings including Typhoon synthetic training facilities and in-flight catering facilities.
 Demolition of buildings.
 Existing aircraft taxiways are to be resurfaced, widened or re-routed and new aircraft taxiways and aprons are to be constructed. 
Initially there were no proposals to carry out work on the existing runways, however this later changed and the runways will be resurfaced.

Moray Council determined that the proposed works did not meet the requirement to go through the EIA process.

E-7 Wedgetail 
In December 2020, the RAF announced that its new fleet of Boeing E-7 Wedgetail AEW1 aircraft were to be based at Lossiemouth from 2023. The Airborne early warning and control aircraft will replace the E-3D Sentry AEW1 fleet which is currently operated by No. 8 Squadron at RAF Waddington in Lincolnshire. The construction of technical facilities to support Wedgetail operations started in October 2022. As of late 2022, the arrival date for the aircraft at RAF Lossiemouth had been delayed to 2024.

Previous units and aircraft 
List of past, present and future flying units and major non-flying units permanently based at Lossiemouth.

Source: Unless otherwise indicated details sourced are from: Hughes, Jim. (1993), Airfield Focus 11: Lossiemouth. Peterborough, GMS Enterprises. , pp. 22–23

Heritage

Station badge and motto 
RAF Lossiemouth's badge, awarded in May 1974, features a snowy owl facing forwards with expanded wings pointed downwards. The owl sits on two crossed claymore swords. The snowy owl can be found in Scotland and compared to humans have a well-developed ability to see at night. This symbolised the use radar for the airborne early warning mission carried out by No. 8 Squadron which was based at Lossiemouth when the badge was awarded. The owl also reflects the wisdom being provided by the Jaguar Operational Conversion Unit at the time. The claymores, a type of historic Scottish sword, represent the location of the station in Scotland and the potential for attack.

The station's motto, translates from Scottish Gaelic as "Be careful".

Community relations and media 

The RAF and local community of Moray enjoy good relations, as demonstrated in 1992 by the station receiving the Freedom of Moray from the then Moray District Council. The freedom was granted in recognition of the role RAF Lossiemouth has played in the defence of the nation and in particular, the greatly valued contribution which has been made by the station to the day-to-day life of Moray. The connections between RAF Lossiemouth and Moray were further strengthened on the signing of the Armed Forces Covenant between Moray Council, other community partners and the RAF in 2012 and again in 2016. The co-operation was recognised in November 2016 when the Ministry of Defence awarded Moray Council an award for its supportive attitude towards the armed forces. The RAF contributes to the local community in spending, employment and activities in the wider community. In 2010, Highlands and Islands Enterprise wrote that RAF Lossiemouth contributed £90.3m to the local economy and supported 3,370 jobs in Moray.

The RAF organise the annual charity Lossiemouth Raft Race, in which military and civilian teams race home-made rafts along the River Lossie, adjacent to Lossiemouth's East Beach. The race was established in 1976 and is attended by thousands of onlookers. A Family and Friends Day also takes place where military families and civilians with connections to the station are invited to a small air-show, held each May. The RAF have also provided photo opportunities for aviation enthusiasts during exercises such as Joint Warrior.

The RAF Lossiemouth station magazine is called the Lossie Lighthouse, in reference to the nearby Covesea Skerries Lighthouse. The magazine is distributed to station personnel, their families and the local community. It is also available online at the RAF Lossiemouth web page.

RAF Lossiemouth has featured in several television and radio documentaries –
 Shackleton – The End of an Era was a 1984 programme produced for Granada TV examining the history of the Shackleton aircraft and featuring No. 8 Squadron whilst at Lossiemouth.
 The Old Grey Ladies of Lossiemouth produced by Grampian TV, captured the final months of Shackleton operations in 1990 before their withdrawal from service.
 Rescue was a thirteen part series which followed the Sea Kings of No. 202 Squadron 'D' Flight for a year and was shown on Grampian TV in 1990.
 Gloria Hunniford at RAF Lossiemouth was a BBC Radio 2 programme broadcast in 1993 in which TV and radio presenter Gloria Hunniford talked to personnel from Lossiemouth and accompanied a helicopter crew on an air sea rescue training exercise.
 JetSet was a six-part series produced by STV in 2006 which followed trainee Tornado GR4 crews as they passed through a six-month operational conversion course with No.15 Squadron. The programme was narrated by Scottish actor Ewan McGregor, whose brother Colin McGregor was a Tornado pilot at Lossiemouth prior to his retirement in 2007.

See also
 List of Royal Air Force stations
List of air stations of the Royal Navy

References

Bibliography

 
 
 
 
 
 
 UK Military Aeronautical Information Publication – Brize Norton (EGVN)

External links 

 
UK Military Aeronautical Information Publication – Lossiemouth (EGQS)

1938 establishments in Scotland
Airports established in 1938
Buildings and structures in Moray
Government buildings completed in 1938
Royal Air Force stations in Scotland
Royal Air Force stations of World War II in the United Kingdom
Transport in Moray
RAF